In Ohio, State Route 70 may refer to:
Interstate 70 in Ohio, the only Ohio highway numbered 70 since about 1962
Ohio State Route 70 (1923), now SR 753 (near Sinking Spring to Greenfield) and SR 41 (Greenfield to Covington)

70